Nicholas Stabulas (December 18, 1929 – February 6, 1973) was an American jazz drummer.

Career 
After working in commercial music, Stabulas was a member of Phil Woods group from 1954 to 1957. He did extensive work as a sideman in the 1950s, with Jon Eardley (1955–56), Jimmy Raney (1955–57), Eddie Costa (1956), Friedrich Gulda (1956), George Wallington (1956–57), Al Cohn (1956–57, 1960), Zoot Sims (1957), Gil Evans (1957), Mose Allison (1957–58), Carmen McRae (1958), and Don Elliott (1958). In the 1960s, he worked with Chet Baker, Kenny Drew, Bill Evans, Lee Konitz and Lennie Tristano. He remained active into the 1970s and died in a car crash in 1973.

Discography
With Mose Allison
Local Color (Prestige, 1957)
Young Man Mose (Prestige, 1958)
With Al Cohn
The Al Cohn Quintet Featuring Bobby Brookmeyer (Coral, 1956) with Bob Brookmeyer
Al and Zoot (Coral, 1957) – with Zoot Sims
With Eddie Costa
Eddie Costa/Vinnie Burke Trio (Josie, 1956)
With Gil Evans
Gil Evans & Ten (Prestige, 1957)
With Friedrich Gulda
Friedrich Gulda at Birdland (RCA Victor, 1957)
A Man of Letters (Decca, 1957)
With Lee Konitz
Motion (Verve, 1961)
With Carmen McRae
Birds of a Feather (Decca, 1958)
With George Wallington
Jazz at Hotchkiss (Savoy, 1957)
With Phil Woods
Woodlore (Prestige, 1955)
Phil and Quill with Prestige (Prestige, 1957)
Sugan (Status, 1957) – with Red Garland

References
"Nick Stabulas". The New Grove Dictionary of Jazz.

Further reading
Leonard Feather, The Encyclopedia of Jazz.

1929 births
1973 deaths
American jazz drummers
Musicians from New York City
Road incident deaths in New York (state)
20th-century American drummers
American male drummers
Jazz musicians from New York (state)
20th-century American male musicians
American male jazz musicians